Barry Cooper may refer to:
 Barry Cooper (activist) (born 1969), former US narcotics officer turned anti-drug war activist
 Barry Cooper (author), British author, teacher and presenter
 Barry Cooper (cricketer) (born 1958), New Zealand cricketer
 Barry Cooper (musicologist) (born 1949), English musicologist and composer
 Barry Cooper (political scientist) (born 1943), Canadian political scientist
 Barry Michael Cooper, American writer, producer and director
 S. Barry Cooper (1943–2015), British mathematician

See also
 Cooper (surname)